Brendan Lynch (died 19 January 2018) was an Irish independent politician, who served as Lord Mayor of Dublin from 1996 to 1997. He was elected to Dublin City Council at the 1974 local elections as an independent councillor for the South Inner City electoral area, and was re-elected at each subsequent election until he retired from politics at the 1999 local elections. He was also the Honorary Director of Donore Credit Union, worked with The Irish Press and was a Peace Commissioner.

He died on 19 January 2018. He was married to Peggy Lynch (née Scott), and they had five children.

References

 

Year of birth missing
20th-century births
2018 deaths
Lord Mayors of Dublin
People from Dublin (city)
Independent politicians in Ireland